Charles-Joseph Flipart (1721–1797) was a French painter and engraver.

Life
He was born in Paris to Jean-Charles Flipart, also an engraver, and his wife Maria (Boll); Jean-Jacques Flipart was his brother. He was baptized in the parish of Saint-Severin. Initially he trained under his father. He later visited Venice, and studied painting under Tiepolo and Amigoni, and engraving under Joseph Wagner. After staying for some time in Rome he was appointed court painter and engraver by King Ferdinand VI of Spain in 1750. His best plates are the portraits of the King and the Queen of Spain. Some of his paintings are in two of the churches at Madrid, where he died in 1797.

References

Sources

Further reading
Bouvy, E., Les escénes de la vie venitienne de Pietro Longhi et Charles-Joseph Flipart, L'Amateur d'Estampes, IX, 1930, no. 4, p. 112-124
Falco Zambelli, A., Contributo a Carlos Giuseppe Flipart (Contributed to Charles Joseph Flipart), Arte Antica e Moderna, 18 (1962)
Luna, Juan José, Introducción al estudio de Charles-Joseph Flipart en España (Introduction to the Studio of Charles Joseph Flipart in Spain''), Homenaje a Antonio Domínguez Ortiz. Madrid, Ministry of Education and Culture, 1981, p. 1121-1138
Carrete Parrondo, J. et al., Catálogo General de la Calcografía Nacional, Madrid, 1987, no. 138
Carrete Parrondo, Juan, "El grabado en el siglo XVIII. Triunfo de la estampa ilustrada", «El grabado en España (Siglos XV-XVIII)», Summa Artis, XXXI, Madrid, 1987, p. 469, 554 and 582.

External links

Charles-Joseph Flipart at the Museo del Prado Online Encyclopedia 

1721 births
1797 deaths
18th-century engravers
18th-century French painters
French male painters
Painters from Paris
Italian engravers
Italian Baroque painters
Rococo painters
French engravers
Court painters
Catholic painters
Catholic engravers
18th-century French male artists